NEF Law College, or in its full name National Education Foundation Law College, is a private law school located in Guwahati, Assam, India. It was established in 2006 and it offers various undergraduate and postgraduate law courses. The NEF Law College is affiliated to  Gauhati University and it also got a status of ' Section 2(f) of UGC Act, 1956 ' from University Grants Commission.

Academics
The college offers a three-year LL.B. (Honours) program and several five years integrated programmes. It also offers a postgraduate LL.M. program. Admission to the five year programmes is based on the basis of NEF Law Entrance Test (NLET). Admission to other programmes is based on merit and cut-off.

Campus

The college functions from its permanent campus located at GMC Road (parallel road to G.S. Road connecting Guwahati Medical College Hospital and Ganeshguri Market) at Christianbasti locality in the heart of Guwahati city.

See also
 Education in Assam
 List of colleges affiliated to Gauhati University
 List of law schools in India

References

External links
 

Law schools in Assam
Universities and colleges in Guwahati
Educational institutions established in 2006
2006 establishments in Assam